The Panasonic Lumix DMC-G10 is the sixth digital mirrorless interchangeable lens camera introduced that adheres to the Micro Four Thirds System (MFT) system design standard, and the fourth Panasonic model MFT camera.  The G10 model was announced concurrently with its more capable sibling, the Panasonic Lumix DMC-G2, in March 2010.

Features 
The G10 was positioned as an entry level, basic MFT camera, similar in form and function to other Panasonic MFT still cameras such as the more feature laden Panasonic Lumix DMC-G1, GH1 and G2.  The G10 retained important core features such as the MFT sensor, and shutter systems, the ability to change lenses, but omitted certain cost driving features, notably the articulating LCD, in favor of a fixed panel LCD, and the high resolution electronic view finder (EVF) in favor of a lower resolution EVF, with a less clear and smooth image than its sister cameras with built-in EVF's.  Unfortunately, using a lower cost EVF has been the one of the main criticisms of what was otherwise considered very capable still camera.  Apparently there are situations under which low resolution EVF is not easily usable.  In fact, other than the EVF and LCD changes, on paper at least, the G10 might even be considered more capable than the G1, because it has video capabilities where the G1 did not.

The G10 featured Motion JPEG video capability only, with a mono microphone, as opposed to more capable AVCHD recording formats found in the other Panasonic G and GH series cameras, with the exception of the G1, which had no video capability.

The G10 is supplied with a standard Panasonic 14–42 mm ƒ/3.5–5.6 kit lens (28–84 mm equivalent) and can use all native Micro Four Thirds System lenses. Four Thirds System lenses can be used with an adapter, as can the lenses from nearly every major manual focus camera mount, such as Leica M, Leica R, Olympus OM, Nikon F, Canon FD, Minolta SR, M42 Screw Mount, Contax/Yashica Mount and others. Canon EF mount lenses can be used with an adapter, but native EF lenses are electronically controlled, and will therefore not have aperture control or autofocus. The Micro Four Thirds System specification supports lenses with optical image stabilization.

The camera was available in one color: black (suffix K).

Upon introduction the United States, MSRP was set at US$600.00 with the kit lens.

Successor Model 

As of mid-2011, the G10 camera had no immediately apparent successor model, with the Panasonic Lumix DMC-G3 seemingly covering the replacement space for both the G10 and the G2 cameras.

Micro Four Thirds Camera introduction roadmap

References

 Panasonic Lumix DMC-G10 web site
 Panasonic Lumix DMC-G10 Press Release
 Panasonic Lumix DMC-G10 Review – Digital Photography Review
 Panasonic Lumix DMC-G10 Review – Imaging Resource Review

External links

G1

de:Panasonic LUMIX DMC-G1
ko:파나소닉 루믹스 DMC-G1
ja:パナソニック・ルミックスDMC-G1
fi:Panasonic Lumix DMC-G1